Zachary Clarke (born 28 March 1990) is a former professional Australian rules footballer. He previously played for the Fremantle Football Club and Essendon Football Club in the Australian Football League (AFL).

Early life
Clarke was born in Australia to an Australian mother and African-American father. He grew up in Melbourne in Victoria playing basketball, a fan of Kevin Garnett and dreamt of playing in the NBA. He represented Victoria in the youth state championships and was organising trails with US clubs before moving to Perth, Western Australia at age 18 when he gave up basketball and transitioned Australian rules.

AFL Career
Clarke was drafted with the 37th selection in the 2008 AFL Draft after playing his first season of competitive football with the Oakleigh Chargers in the TAC Cup in 2008.  He represented Victoria Metro at the 2008 AFL Under 18 Championships.  At 203 cm, he had previously played basketball for the Nunawading Spectres and had hoped to play at a US College.  An athletic player with good endurance, he lived with Fremantle's first choice ruckman, 211 cm Aaron Sandilands when he first moved to Western Australia.  He attended Koonung Secondary College.

For the 2009 season, Clarke was allocated to play for East Perth Football Club in the West Australian Football League and after two impressive games was named in Fremantle's senior squad for their Round 3 match against Adelaide. He eventually made his debut in the round 13 clash against Collingwood Football Club after averaging an impressive 16 hit outs in the WAFL.

In round 20, 2011, following a strong performance against St Kilda, Clarke was nominated for the 2011 AFL Rising Star.

Clarke was delisted by Fremantle at the conclusion of the 2017 season, having missed much of the past two seasons through injury.

In November 2018, Clarke returned to AFL, joining Essendon via the newly implemented pre-season supplemental selection period.

In October 2019, Clarke was delisted by  after 9 games in the 2019 season.

Statistics
 Statistics are correct to the end of the 2016 season

|- style="background-color: #EAEAEA"
! scope="row" style="text-align:center" | 2009
|
| 30 || 5 || 0 || 0 || 9 || 36 || 45 || 8 || 10 || 35 || 0.0 || 0.0 || 1.8 || 7.2 || 9.0 || 1.6 || 2.0 || 7.0
|-
! scope="row" style="text-align:center" | 2010
|
| 30 || 3 || 0 || 1 || 3 || 17 || 20 || 3 || 12 || 25 || 0.0 || 0.3 || 1.0 || 5.7 || 6.7 || 1.0 || 4.0 || 8.3
|- style="background-color: #EAEAEA"
! scope="row" style="text-align:center" | 2011
|
| 30 || 13 || 6 || 6 || 62 || 115 || 177 || 42 || 68 || 172 || 0.5 || 0.5 || 4.8 || 8.8 || 13.6 || 3.2 || 5.2 || 13.2
|-
! scope="row" style="text-align:center" | 2012
|
| 30 || 15 || 13 || 13 || 105 || 67 || 172 || 67 || 48 || 121 || 0.9 || 0.9 || 7.0 || 4.5 || 11.5 || 4.5 || 3.2 || 8.1
|- style="background-color: #EAEAEA"
! scope="row" style="text-align:center" | 2013
|
| 30 || 17 || 8 || 3 || 84 || 142 || 226 || 68 || 57 || 355 || 0.5 || 0.2 || 4.9 || 8.4 || 13.3 || 4.0 || 3.4 || 20.9
|-
! scope="row" style="text-align:center" | 2014
|
| 30 || 21 || 12 || 10 || 132 || 126 || 258 || 92 || 57 || 252 || 0.6 || 0.5 || 6.3 || 6.0 || 12.3 || 4.4 || 2.7 || 12.0
|- style="background-color: #EAEAEA"
! scope="row" style="text-align:center" | 2015
|
| 30 || 14 || 7 || 2 || 73 || 75 || 148 || 57 || 28 || 162 || 0.5 || 0.1 || 5.2 || 5.4 || 10.6 || 4.1 || 2.0 || 11.6
|-
! scope="row" style="text-align:center" | 2016
|
| 30 || 13 || 0 || 3 || 37 || 89 || 126 || 37 || 35 || 249 || 0.0 || 0.2 || 2.8 || 6.8 || 9.7 || 2.8 || 2.7 || 19.2
|- class="sortbottom"
! colspan=3| Career
! 101
! 46
! 38
! 505
! 667
! 1172
! 374
! 315
! 1371
! 0.5
! 0.4
! 5.0
! 6.6
! 11.6
! 3.7
! 3.1
! 13.6
|}

References

External links

WAFL Player Profile and Statistics

Living people
East Perth Football Club players
Australian people of African-American descent
Fremantle Football Club players
Essendon Football Club players
Australian rules footballers from Melbourne
1990 births
Oakleigh Chargers players
Peel Thunder Football Club players
Subiaco Football Club players